Greenhill & Co., Inc. is an American investment bank founded in 1996 by Robert F. Greenhill. The firm provides advice on mergers, acquisitions, restructurings, financings, and capital raisings to leading corporations, partnerships, institutions and governments across a number of industries.

Recent clients include Actavis, Alcoa, Energy Future Holdings, Fluor Corporation, Gannett, Genuine Parts Company, GlaxoSmithKline, London Stock Exchange Group, Safeway, Tesco, Teva, and the US Department of Treasury.

Located in New York, Greenhill remains a global pure advisory firm entirely focused on complex financial transactions across the globe.

History 
Greenhill was established in New York City in 1996 by Robert F. Greenhill, the former president of Morgan Stanley and former chairman and chief executive officer of Smith Barney. He founded the first M&A group on Wall Street while at Morgan Stanley and became an early pioneer of the industry.

Greenhill has been featured in many prominent assignments since its founding including the $100 billion acquisition of ABN AMRO in 2007, the United States Department of Treasury's divestiture of its $51 billion stake in AIG in 2012, and the $17 billion merger between Northwest Airlines and Delta Air Lines in 2008. The firm was also involved as an adviser to a highly influential group of former Morgan Stanley partners in their successful and controversial bid to have former Morgan Stanley CEO Philip J. Purcell step down in 2005.

Like a number of other independent investment banks, Greenhill has grown by recruiting a significant number of managing directors from major investment banks (as well as senior professionals from other institutions). The firm has also expanded globally, opening further offices and operations in North America, Europe, Australasia, Asia, South America and the Middle East, most recently in Tel Aviv and in Singapore.

In May 2004, the firm completed an initial public offering of common stock onto the New York Stock Exchange.

Recent activities 
In October 2013, the firm announced that it had opened an office in São Paulo in conjunction with hiring Daniel Wainstein, the former head of Goldman Sachs' Brazilian investment banking business.

In 2014, Greenhill advised on the $25 billion acquisition of Forest Laboratories by Actavis and the $10 billion merger between Safeway and Albertsons. Both transactions were among the ten largest of the year globally.

In January 2015, Greenhill agreed to purchase Cogent Partners, a leading investment bank focused on secondary market advisory for private equity investments.

In July 2015, Greenhill advised Teva Pharmaceuticals on the $40.5 billion acquisition of Allergan plc’s Generics business in one of the largest transactions globally in 2015.

In 2017, Greenhill advised Tesco on the £3.7 billion acquisition of Booker, the UK's largest food wholesale operator. Greenhill's team was led by David Wyles, the bank's president in London, and Charles Gournay, managing director, and the deal was confirmed in March 2018.

In 2017, Greenhill advised Ladbrokes Coral for a £4 billion takeover approach by GVC. Greenhill worked together with UBS in the same teams that advised on the merger between Ladbrokes and Gala Coral in 2016.

In 2019, Greenhill advised International Flavors & Fragrances on its merger with DuPont’s Nutrition & Biosciences (N&B) business in a Reverse Morris Trust transaction. The deal valued the combined company at $45.4 billion on an enterprise value basis, reflecting a value of $26.2 billion for the N&B business based on IFF’s share price as of December 13, 2019.

Global presence 
Greenhill operates from 17 offices globally across North and South America, Europe and the Middle East, and Asia and Australia:

 Toronto
 Chicago
 Dallas
 Houston
 New York City
 San Francisco
 Paris
 Frankfurt
 Tel Aviv
 Madrid
 Stockholm
 London
 Melbourne
 Sydney
 Hong Kong
 Tokyo
 Singapore

Notable current and former employees 
 Robert F. Greenhill – founder and chairman of Greenhill & Co
 Scott Bok – CEO of Greenhill & Co
 David Wyles – president of Greenhill & Co
 Lord Lupton – former chairman of Greenhill Europe, life peer
 William Perez – former CEO of Wm. Wrigley Jr. Company
 Simon Borrows – CEO of 3i
 Brian Cassin – CEO of Experian
 James Stewart – CEO of MGM Growth Properties
 Sir Simon Mayall – former British lieutenant general
 Ben Loomes – co-head, 3i Infrastructure
 Andrew Woeber – former Morgan Stanley managing director, Cravath lawyer and Stanford board member

See also
 List of investment banks
 Boutique investment bank

References

External links

Companies listed on the New York Stock Exchange
Financial services companies established in 1996
Banks established in 1996
Investment banks in the United States
1996 establishments in New York City
2004 initial public offerings